Kelly Butte may refer to:

Kelly Butte, part of Kelly Butte Natural Area in Portland, Oregon
Kelly Butte (Springfield, Oregon)
Kelly Butte (Washington), a summit in King County, Washington